Troy Davis (1968–2011) was convicted of murder and executed in 2011.

Troy Davi(e)s may also refer to:

 Troy Davis (Australian footballer) (born 1992), Australian rules footballer for Melbourne
 Troy Davis (linebacker) (born 1991), New York Jets outside linebacker 
 Troy Davis (running back) (born 1975), National Football League and Canadian Football League running back
 Troy Davies (1960–2007), Australian artist and musician